The Snow Girl is a Spanish mystery thriller television series based on the novel by  which stars Milena Smit.

Plot 
The plot tracks intern journalist Miren, set on finding the whereabouts of missing girl Amaya Martín, disappeared during the 2010 Cavalcade of Magi in Málaga. Helped by veteran journalist Eduardo, she carries out a parallel investigation to inspector Belén Millán's.

Cast

Production 
Jesús Mesas and Javier Andrés Roig took over writing duties whereas David Ulloa and Laura Alvea directed the episodes. The series was produced by Atípica Films. It was shot in between Málaga and Madrid.

Release 
Netflix released the series on 27 January 2023.

References 

2023 Spanish television series debuts
Spanish-language television shows
Spanish mystery television series
Spanish crime television series
Spanish thriller television series
Television series based on Spanish novels
Television shows filmed in Spain
Television shows set in Andalusia
Television series set in 2010
Television series about missing people
2020s Spanish drama television series